Abadie's sign of exophthalmic goiter is a medical sign characterized by spasm of the levator palpebrae superioris muscle with retraction of the upper lid (so that sclera is visible above cornea) seen in Graves-Basedow disease which, together with exophthalmos causes the bulging eyes appearance.

It is named for Jean Marie Charles Abadie.

See also
 Abadie's sign of tabes dorsalis

References

Symptoms and signs: Endocrinology, nutrition, and metabolism
Medical signs